Mitt is both a surname and a given name. Notable people with the name include:

Surname 
Aleksander Mitt (1903–1942), Estonian speed skater
Arnold Mitt (born 1988), Estonian basketball player
Tarmo Mitt (born 1977), Estonian strongman

Given name 
Mitt Romney (born 1947), American politician and businessman
Milton Romney (1899–1975), former American football player

See also

Mito (name)

Estonian-language surnames